Daimonion may refer to:

Another name for a daemon
Daimonion (band), a Polish rock band
Daimonion (Daimonion album), 2007
Daimonion (Project Pitchfork album), 2001